"Riding Away" is the first single released by the German hard rock band Cacumen which would evolve into Bonfire.  This is also the band's first release.  In 2002/2003, Claus Lessmann and Hans Ziller purchased the rights to the Cacumen material and re-released the collection under the Bonfire name individually as well as a box set called The Early Days.  This single was featured on Part 1 of the collection, added to the Cacumen self-titled album.

Track listing

Band members
Claus Lessmann - lead vocals
Hans Ziller - guitars
Karl Ziller - guitars
Horst Maier - guitars
Hans Hauptmann - bass
Hanns Schmidt-Theissen - keyboards
Hans Forstner - drums

1979 singles
Bonfire (band) songs
1979 songs